Assault of the Killer Bimbos is a 1988 American comedy film starring Elizabeth Kaitan, Christina Whitaker, and Tammara Souza.

Premise
Two go-go dancers, Lulu (Elizabeth Kaitan) and Peaches (Christina Whitaker), are framed for the murder of their employer by the real killer, sleazy gangster Vinnie (Mike Muscat). Picking up waitress Darlene (Tammara Souza) along the way, the three are involved in wild car chases with cops as they head south to cross the border into Mexico, where they unexpectedly encounter Vinnie in a fleabag Mexican motel.

Cast
 Elizabeth Kaitan as Lulu
 Christina Whitaker as Peaches
 Tammara Souza as Darlene
 Nick Cassavetes as Wayne-O
 Griffin O'Neal as Troy
 Mike Muscat as Vinnie
 Patti Astor as Poodles
 Eddie Deezen as Dopey Deputy 
 Clayton Landey as Hernandez 
 Paul Ben-Victor as Customer 
 Arell Blanton as Sheriff 
 Jamie Bozian as Billy 
 David Marsh as Shifty Joe
 Jeffrey Orman as Deputy
 John T. Quern as Bartender
 Keith Giaimo as Rip

Reception
Roger Ebert of Chicago Sun-Times offered a mixed review of the film, not praising it while neither condemning it. He offered that the title accurately described the movie and wrote that it was "one of those movies where the lights are on but nobody's at home. It is the most simpleminded movie in many a moon, a vacant and brainless exercise in dreck, and I almost enjoyed myself sometimes, sort of. The movie is so cheerfully dim-witted and the characters are so enthusiastically sleazoid that the film takes on a kind of awful charm."  Don Kaye of Rovi wrote that the film was "a dumb-but-hip instant cult favorite that knows - and revels in - its limitations."

Production
Casting of the film was ongoing in May 1987 with Generic Films to begin shooting on June 5 as part of a four-picture contract with Empire Pictures. Empire was ultimately displeased with the film delivered by Generic Films and the title was reassigned to a new film from director Anita Rosenberg that filmed in October 1987. The original version was later released as Cemetery High.

Soundtrack
T# "I've Been Watching You"  – written by Kent Knight, Warren Dixon, Steven T. Easter and performed by Knight Time
 "Headed For Heartbreak"
 "Tennessee and Texas"
 "Mister Right"
 "Shopping For Boys"
 "Do Me Right"
 "All The Way"
 "Bimbo Breakdown"
 "Kiss And Tell"
 "Yo-Yo"
 "Hot Plastic"
 "Bongos In Pastel"
 "Doin' The Cha Cha Cha"

References

External links
 
  Assault of the Killer Bimbos  at Rotten Tomatoes
 Film trailer

1988 films
1980s comedy horror films
American comedy horror films
1988 comedy films
1980s English-language films
1980s American films